Call signs in Mexico are unique identifiers for telecommunications, radio communication, radio broadcasting and transmission. They are regulated internationally by the ITU as well as nationally by the Federal Telecommunications Institute, which regulates broadcast stations, wireless telecommunications and spectrum use.

The International Telecommunication Union has assigned Mexico the following call sign blocks for all radio communication, broadcasting or transmission:

While not directly related to call signs, the International Telecommunication Union (ITU) further has divided all countries assigned amateur radio prefixes into three regions; Mexico is located in ITU Region 2. Mexico is in ITU zone 10 and CQ zone 6.

Broadcasting

XE
Mexico uses the prefix XE for radio stations in the A.M. & shortwave services. Following the callsign, either the suffix -AM or -OC (Onda Corta, the Spanish term for shortwave) are included. Sometimes, [[FM broadcasting 
|F.M.]] or television stations also have “XE” callsigns, but these are typically very old (XETRA-FM and XETV-TDT are examples of this).

XH
XH is used exclusively for F.M. radio stations, and television stations. F.M. stations’ calls carry the -FM suffix, whereas digital television stations carry the -TDT suffix; -TV was used for analog television stations.

Call sign assignments for amateur radio

The IFT issues call signs in the XE and XF series for amateur use, the latter mainly for offshore use. There are 60,000 licensed ham radio operators in Mexico.  

The separating numeral is used to identify the region in which the amateur is licensed:

Call signs for foreign hams
Typically a permit to operate in Mexico will state the call sign you are to use, and can be one's home call sign with a further XE prefix.  For instance if your home call sign is WA1ZZZ, you might be assigned XE1/WA1ZZZ.

Further, if you operate outside of the XE1 area, you would add a further identifying suffix – for instance XE1/WA1ZZZ/XE2 if you were operating in northern Mexico.  The call sign must be given always as enumerated on the permit, and the operator's location must also be stated in Spanish.

The permit does not automatically allow operation in XF island areas.  Special permission must be sought for island operation.

Special events
Call signs in the 6DA–6JZ block have been used for special event call signs on a temporary basis. In 2007, 6G1LM was assigned to Federación Mexicana de Radioexperimentadores for their 75th anniversary, as was 6F75A.  Occasionally, other special call sign prefixes have been briefly allowed, such as XA5T, XB9Z, and XE0DX during major amateur radio contests. 4C1ASM was used by the Asociación de Scouts de Mexico (Mexican Scouts Association) during the Jamboree on the Air JOTA for some years.

6H1 also replaced the XE1 prefix, 6I2 replaced the XE2 prefix, and 6J3 replaced the XE3 prefix.  6E4 replaced XF4 for the Revillagigedo island group.

See also
 Amateur radio international operation
 Call signs
 ITU prefix – amateur and experimental stations
 Amateur radio license

External links
 Federal Telecommunications Institute
 FEDERACION MEXICANA DE RADIO EXPERIMENTADORES, A.C. – FMRE, Mexico's national organization for amateur radio (in Spanish)

References

Mexico
Communications in Mexico
Mass media in Mexico